Rublev (masculine, sometimes Rublyov; also Rublevsky) or Rubleva (feminine, sometimes Rublyova) is a Russian surname. The origin of the surname can come either from Russian unit of currency ruble or from an old kind of washboards called rubels that might indicate the profession of an ancestor.

The following people share this surname:
 Andrei Rublev (14th–15th centuries), the greatest medieval Russian painter of Orthodox icons and frescoes.
 Andrey Rublev (born October 20, 1997), a Russian professional tennis player.
 Ekaterina Rubleva (born October 10, 1985), a Russian ice dancer.
 Sergei Rublevsky (born 15 October 1974), a Russian chess grandmaster.

Russian-language surnames